Pantachordodes is a genus of worms belonging to the family Chordodidae.

Species:
 Pantachordodes europaeus (Heinze, 1952)

References

Nematomorpha